Teglgårdsvej railway halt is a railway halt serving the western part of the town of Hjørring in Vendsyssel, Denmark.

The halt is located on the Hirtshals Line from Hirtshals to Hjørring. It was opened in 2004. The train services are currently operated by Nordjyske Jernbaner which run frequent local train services between Hirtshals and Hjørring with onward connections from Hjørring to the rest of Denmark.

Operations 
The train services are currently operated by Nordjyske Jernbaner which run frequent local train services between Hirtshals and Hjørring with onward connections from Hjørring to the rest of Denmark.

References

Notes

Bibliography

External links
 Nordjyske Jernbaner – Danish railway company operating in North Jutland Region
 Danske Jernbaner – website with information on railway history in Denmark
 Nordjyllands Jernbaner – website with information on railway history in North Jutland

Railway stations in the North Jutland Region
Railway stations opened in 2004
Railway stations in Denmark opened in the 21st century